Léon-Jules Léauthier (1874–1894) was a French anarchist who attempted to assassinate the Serbian ambassador to France in 1893. He was sentenced to the Salvation Islands penal colony of Cayenne, French Guiana, where he died within a year during a prisoner revolt.

References

Bibliography 

 

 

1874 births
1894 deaths
French anarchists
Failed assassins
People from Manosque
Devil's Island inmates
Violent deaths in France